is a Japanese footballer who plays as a centre-back for  club Iwaki FC.

Youth career
Ieizumi played for his high school between 2015 and 2017, before going on to play for Ryutsu Keizai University FC. In 2018 and 2019, Ieizumi played 21 times in the Japan Football League for the university affiliate side Ryutsu Keizai Dragons Ryugasaki and scored his first goal for them in a 3–3 with MIO Biwako Shiga. In 2021, he played almost every game in the JUFA Kanto League 1 season, scoring two goals and helping Ryutsu Keizai University to win the championship. He also scored on his Emperor's Cup debut in a 3–2 defeat by YSCC Yokohama.

Club career
In December 2021, it was announced that Ieizumi would be signing for newly promoted J3 League team Iwaki FC for the 2022 season. He made his debut for the team in March in a 1–1 league draw with Kagoshima United and scored his first goal in a 5–0 win over Vanraure Hachinohe.

At the end of the 2022 season, Ieizumi had helped Iwaki gain promotion to the J2 League for the first time in their history playing in 33 of a possible 34 games. For his efforts, he was inducted into the 2022 J3 Best XI.

Career statistics

Club
.

Honours

 Iwaki FC
J3 League : 2022

 Individual
J3 League Best XI: 2022

References

External links
Profile at Iwaki FC
Profile at J.League

2000 births
Living people
Japanese footballers
Association football defenders
Association football people from Kagawa Prefecture
Ryutsu Keizai University alumni
Iwaki FC players
J3 League players